Litarachna is a genus of mites belonging to the family Pontarachnidae.

The species of this genus are found in Europe, Eastern Asia and Australia.

Species:

Litarachna amnicola 
Litarachna antalyaensis 
Litarachna bartschae 
Litarachna brasiliensis 
Litarachna bruneiensis 
Litarachna caribica 
Litarachna cawthorni 
Litarachna communis 
Litarachna curtipalpis 
Litarachna degiustii 
Litarachna denhami 
Litarachna divergens 
Litarachna duboscqi 
Litarachna enigmatica 
Litarachna gracilis 
Litarachna halei 
Litarachna haleioides 
Litarachna hongkongensis 
Litarachna incerta 
Litarachna indica 
Litarachna kamui 
Litarachna lopezae 
Litarachna lukai 
Litarachna madagascariensis 
Litarachna marshalli 
Litarachna minuta 
Litarachna muelleri 
Litarachna muratsezgini 
Litarachna sabangensis 
Litarachna sagamiensis 
Litarachna smiti 
Litarachna thetis 
Litarachna triangularis

References

Acari